Josan Michael C. Nimes (born May 11, 1991) is a Filipino professional basketball player who last played for the Pasig Sta. Lucia Realtors of the Maharlika Pilipinas Basketball League (MPBL).

Early life

Nimes was born in Talavera, Nueva Ecija in the Philippines to Filipino parents and is the only boy among four siblings. At age four, his family moved to Australia and stayed there until he reached 15 years old. During his time in Australia he attended Good Shepherd Primary in Plumpton, Sydney and later attended Parramatta Marist High School in Westmead, Sydney where he played for the schools A-grade team as the unanimous super star athlete. Then, they moved to Phoenix, Arizona where he spent his high school years. He came back to the Philippines when he was 19 years old.

College career

Nimes studied at the Mapua Institute of Technology and first played for the Mapua Cardinals in 2011 as a rookie. In his rookie season, he averaged 15.8 points and 4.7 rebounds that earned him the Rookie of the Year honors. He missed full two seasons in 2013 and 2014 due to back problems and an anterior cruciate ligament (ACL) injury on his left knee. He has since returned to action in 2015 while attempting to lead the Cardinals in his final collegiate year.

Amateur career

While in the amateur ranks, Nimes suited up for the Cafe France Bakers in the PBA D-League.

Professional career

On August 23, 2015, Nimes was drafted 12th overall by the Rain or Shine Elasto Painters in the 2015 PBA draft.

PBA career statistics

As of the end of 2016–17 season

Season-by-season averages
 
|-
| align=left | 
| align=left | Rain or Shine
| 24 || 8.0 || .325 || .286 || .533 || 1.4 || .8 || .1 || .0 || 1.6
|-
| align=left | 
| align=left | Columbian
| 17 || 10.6 || .432 || .250 || 1.000 || 1.5 || 1.1 || .1 || .0 || 2.5

References

1991 births
Living people
Basketball players from Nueva Ecija
Filipino men's basketball players
Terrafirma Dyip players
Mapúa Cardinals basketball players
Rain or Shine Elasto Painters players
Shooting guards
Small forwards
Maharlika Pilipinas Basketball League players
Maharlika Pilipinas Basketball League
Rain or Shine Elasto Painters draft picks